Achyrocalyx is a genus of flowering plants in the family Acanthaceae. It is native to Madagascar.

Taxonomy 
It was first described by Raymond Benoist in 1930 (in a publication dated to 1929).

Description

Species 
The African Plant Database recognises the following four species as of 2012:
 Achyrocalyx decaryi
 Achyrocalyx gossypinus
 Achyrocalyx pungens
 Achyrocalyx vicinus

References 

Acanthaceae
Acanthaceae genera
Plants described in 1929
Endemic flora of Madagascar